Jean-Louis Cazes (born 2 October 1951 in Bayonne) is a French former professional football defender. He manages Genêts Anglet.

He was part of SC Bastia team that reached the 1978 UEFA Cup Final.

External links
 
 Profile

1951 births
Living people
French footballers
Association football defenders
Aviron Bayonnais FC players
AS Saint-Étienne players
SC Bastia players
Ligue 1 players
French football managers
Sportspeople from Bayonne
French-Basque people
Footballers from Nouvelle-Aquitaine